Furas Hashim is an Iraqi Olympic boxer. He represented his country in the light-middleweight division at the 1992 Summer Olympics. He won his first bout against Miguel Jiménez, and then lost his second bout to Maselino Masoe.

References

1971 births
Living people
Iraqi male boxers
Olympic boxers of Iraq
Boxers at the 1992 Summer Olympics
Light-middleweight boxers